Carmen Christian School, abbreviated as CCS, is a Private, Christian, Co-ed, K to 10 school located in the Municipality of Carmen, Cebu, Philippines. It was established in 1997.

Christian schools in the Philippines
Schools in Cebu